The Iceland women's national under-16 basketball team is a national basketball team of Iceland, administered by the Icelandic Basketball Federation.
It represents the country in women's international under-16 basketball competitions.

The team won three gold and one silver medals at the FIBA U16 Women's European Championship Division C.

See also
Iceland women's national basketball team
Iceland women's national under-18 basketball team
Iceland men's national under-16 basketball team

References

External links
Archived records of Iceland team participations

Basketball in Iceland
Women's national under-16 basketball teams
Women's national sports teams of Iceland